The East German electric locomotives of DR Class E 251 (from 1970: 251, DBAG Class 171) were not standard engines either within the Deutsche Reichsbahn's or subsequently the Deutsche Bahn's fleet, due to the different specification of their electrical system. They were only used on the  Blankenburg (Harz) – Königshütte (Rübeland Railway) line. Because this line had steep inclines, but connecting this isolated branch to the main traction network would have been very expensive, the Deutsche Reichsbahn electrified it in 1965 with a 25 kV 50 Hz system, which was different from the usual German catenary supply of 15 kV 16⅔ Hz. The 15 Co’Co’ engines were supplied by LEW and registered with the Reichsbahn as E 251 001 to 015.

Service 
Of the original 15 locomotives, 11 were deployed until December 2004 in charge of goods trains on the Rübeland Railway. Until that point they were stabled at Bw Blankenburg. Apart from 171 001 and 171 002, which were returned to their original state and placed under conservation protection, almost all locomotives are in the old Bw Zwickau, where they are awaiting future duties in southeast Europe. Class 171-hauled passenger services hauled ended in 2000 because the Federal Railway Office required the installation of door opening systems (Türsteuerung or TB0) on passenger trains. A TBO option for the trains was not followed through for cost reasons. Neither were the engines equipped with Sifa until 1998, because the additional crew member required on steep inclines initially meant that Sifa was not needed.

Electrification of this engine's main route with a 25 kV catenary system had eventually to be carried out both for noise and environmental protection reasons and it was even joined for a while in 2004 by locomotives of classes 185 and 189. However, in 2005 there was a changeover to diesel locomotives of classes 233 and 241 operated by Railion as well as the Blue Tiger. Previously  of the transport duties were allocated to the Osthavelländische Eisenbahn (today ), so the provision of electric locomotives by Railion was now no longer sufficiently economic.

Livery 
Originally all 15 engines were painted green. From the middle of the 1970s, however, they were resprayed bordeaux red with a wide, ivory-coloured stripe. This was later painted much narrower on the sides. The DB also had the engines repainted in the livery of the time.

Preserved 
Nos. E 251 001 and 002 are today designated as museum locomotives and are based in Blankenburg. Both locos are protected which is also the reason for their remaining in Blankenburg. All other engines of Class 171 were transferred to Zwickau following the termination of their service by Railion Deutschland AG. The locomotive train (comprising 171 011, 171 009, 171 003, 171 008, 171 004, 171 014, 171 013  and 171 005) reached Halle on 13 April 2005 and then continued to Zwickau on 21 April 2005. There the engines were stored in Shed II of the old Bw Zwickau. On 9 February 2006 no. 171 008 was towed by 232 701 from Zwickau to Dresden-Friedrichstadt, where its wheelsets were worked on the underfloor lathe. It was then taken by several diesel locomotives of various classes to Regensburg-Hafen. From there the first locomotive of Class 171 made its way to Romania. There it has been hired to the Logistic Center Bulgaria Branch. This fate was planned for the remaining locomotives in Zwickau, they were to be likewise operated by a Railion subsidiary in Romania. However this has not yet happened and the engines remain in Zwickau. By contrast a museum home was found for no. 171 012. She has gone into the possession of the TEV (Thuringian Railway Society) who will look after the maintenance of the engine and present it at various events. Nos. 171 006, 007, 010 and 015 were dismantled.

Current overview of the remaining locomotives (as at: September 2007)

171 001 – green – Blankenburg (Harz) - returned to original delivery state to become a technical monument
171 002 – green – Blankenburg (Harz) - returned to original delivery state to become a technical monument
171 003 – traffic red (verkehrsrot) – Zwickau
171 004 – traffic red (verkehrsrot) – Zwickau
171 005 – orient red (orientrot) – Zwickau
171 006 – red – scrapped
171 007 – red – scrapped
171 008 – traffic red (verkehrsrot) – Timișoara in Romania (tests to be carried out to determine whether to send the rest)
171 009 – orient red (orientrot) – Zwickau
171 010 – red – scrapped
171 011 – orient red (orientrot) – Zwickau
171 012 – bordeaux red – TEV Weimar
171 013 – traffic red (verkehrsrot) – Zwickau
171 014 – traffic red (verkehrsrot) – Zwickau
171 015 – red – scrapped at Aw Dessau

Sources 
 

Railway locomotives introduced in 1965
E 251
Electric locomotives of Germany
171
Standard gauge locomotives of Germany
Freight locomotives
LEW locomotives